Instant Family is a 2018 American family comedy-drama film starring Mark Wahlberg and Rose Byrne as parents who adopt three siblings, played by Isabela Moner, Gustavo Quiroz, and Julianna Gamiz. Also starring Margo Martindale, Julie Hagerty, Tig Notaro, and Octavia Spencer, the film is directed by Sean Anders, who wrote the screenplay with John Morris, based in part on Anders' own experiences.

Instant Family was released in the United States on November 16, 2018. It grossed over $120 million worldwide, and was called an "earnest, heartwarming comedy" by critics, who also praised the performances.

Plot
Husband and wife Pete and Ellie Wagner, derided by relatives who think they will never have children, consider adoption. They enroll in foster care, led by social workers Karen and Sharon. At a fair to meet foster children, Ellie voices her reluctance to foster/adopt a teen, when they are confronted by 15-year-old Lizzie, who impresses them.

Karen and Sharon reveal that Lizzie has two siblings, 10-year-old Juan and 6-year-old Lita, and their mother is a drug addict, in prison; if they want Lizzie, they must take Juan and Lita too. The Wagners' meeting with Lizzie and her siblings does not result in an immediate connection, making them reconsider. At Thanksgiving dinner with Ellie's family, Pete and Ellie say they have decided not to adopt. The family admits no one actually believed it would work out, so Pete and Ellie decide to officially adopt them.

Lizzie, Juan, and Lita move in with the Wagners, whose lives become hectic – Lita will only eat potato chips, Juan is extremely emotional and fragile, and Lizzie resents Ellie's attempts to parent them. The Wagners turn to a foster parent support group. Pete's mother Sandy wins the kids over by taking the family to Six Flags, but Lizzie disappears with friends and returns late, prompting Pete to ground her.

The next day, as Pete and Ellie confront Lizzie trying to leave with friends, Juan accidentally shoots a nail into his foot. Seeing Pete and Ellie rush Juan to the hospital and comfort Lita, Lizzie begins to warm up to them, and Pete invites her to vent her frustrations by demolishing the kitchen of the house he is renovating. Lita calls Pete "Daddy" after he fixes her doll during Lizzie's soccer practice. At night, Ellie walks into Juan and Lita's room, hearing Juan having a nightmare. After Ellie comforts him, Juan says, “Good night, Mommy.” Ellie is overjoyed.

Pete and Ellie meet Carla, the kids’ mother, who is out of prison, wanting to reunite with her children. The Wagners express their feelings to the support group, but the social workers explain the system's main goal is to keep families together, and the children may be returned to their birth mother.

Carla's meetings with her children disrupt the Wagner household; the children become more unruly, leaving Pete and Ellie demotivated and frustrated. They are horrified to discover Lizzie taking naked pictures of herself to send to Jacob at school, who sends her a 'dick pic'. Pete and Ellie seek out the Fernandez family, whose adoptive daughter Brenda had inspired them at their orientation. They learn Brenda is back in rehab, but Mr. and Mrs. Fernandez assure the Wagners that "things that matter are hard".

Taking the children to school the next day, Pete and Ellie confront a student named Charlie, mistakenly thinking he is Jacob, only to apologize for the mix-up when he tells them the truth; when Pete asks Charlie if he knows anyone named Jacob who's been hanging around Lizzie, Charlie points out Jacob is the school's 22-year-old janitor. They beat him up and he is arrested, as are Pete and Ellie, accidentally leaving Juan and Lita in the car unattended. Returning home after posting bail, Pete and Ellie are told by Sandy that they need to reassure Lizzie that they love her.

At the children's court hearing, the judge reads a statement from Lizzie, detailing Pete and Ellie's actions negatively. He refuses to let Ellie read her own statement, and the children are returned to Carla. Juan and Lita do not want to leave the Wagners, but Lizzie is ready. The next day, Karen and Sharon arrive to tell the kids that Carla is not coming for them, having failed to appear that morning. They also reveal that, when they got to see her, it was clear to them that Carla was using drugs again and claimed that Lizzie was the one who filled out all of the paperwork. Lizzie tearfully runs away heartbroken, so Pete and Ellie chase after her. They re-assure her that they love her, and the trio reconcile.

Four months later, the family attends the court hearing that finalizes the adoption of Lizzie, Juan, and Lita. The family pose for a picture, joined by the judge, their families, and fellow foster families.

Cast
 Mark Wahlberg as Pete Wagner
 Rose Byrne as Ellie Wagner
 Isabela Merced as Lizzie Wagner, 15-years old and the oldest sibling.
 Gustavo Escobar as Juan Wagner, 10-years old and the middle sibling.
 Julianna Gamiz as Lita Wagner, 6-years old and the youngest sibling.
 Octavia Spencer as Karen, one of the social workers who guides the parents-to-be through the foster care process
 Tig Notaro as Sharon, one of the social workers who guide the parents-to-be through the foster care process
 Margo Martindale as Grandma Sandy, Pete's overbearing and goodhearted mother
 Julie Hagerty as Jen, Ellie's soft spoken and naive mother
 Michael O'Keefe as Jerry, Ellie's father
 Tom Segura as Russ, Kim's husband
 Allyn Rachel as Kim, Ellie's sister
 Iliza Shlesinger as October
 Valente Rodriguez as Judge Rivas, the Adoption Court Judge
 Charlie McDermott as Stewart, Pete's co-worker
 Carson Holmes as Charlie
 Nicholas Logan as Jacob
 Joselin Reyes as Carla, the children's birthmother
 Eve Harlow as Brenda
 Andrea Anders as Jessie
 Gary Weeks as Dirk
 Joan Cusack as Mrs. Howard

Production
The film was inspired by Anders' own experiences fostering and then adopting three siblings. The children were aged 6 years, 3 years, and 18 months. Anders talked to other adoptive families and teenagers who had grown up in care and then been adopted in order to research the character of Lizzy.

Rose Byrne joined the cast of the film on November 17, 2017. Isabela Merced co-stars alongside Mark Wahlberg for a second time, after previously working together on Transformers: The Last Knight in 2017. Octavia Spencer, Tig Notaro, Iliza Shlesinger, Gustavo Escobar (Gustavo Quiroz), Julianna Gamiz, and Tom Segura were added to the cast in February 2018, with filming beginning the following month, and lasting until May 14.

Release
Instant Family was originally scheduled for release in the United States on February 15, 2019, before being moved up three months, to November 16, 2018. On November 10, 2018, it was announced the film's November 11 premiere in Los Angeles would be canceled due to the Woolsey Fire, but that a screening would take place at an evacuation center for victims of the fires. Instant Family became available on Digital on February 19, 2019, and on DVD/Blu-Ray on March 5, 2019.

Instant Family was rated PG in Australia and M in New Zealand.

Reception

Box office
Instant Family grossed $67.4 million in the United States and Canada, and $53.2 million in other territories, for a worldwide total of $120.6 million, against a production budget of $48 million.

In the United States and Canada, Instant Family was released alongside Fantastic Beasts: The Crimes of Grindelwald and Widows, and was projected to gross $15–20 million from 3,258 theaters in its opening weekend. It made $4.8 million on its first day, including $550,000 from Thursday night previews. It went on to debut to $14.7 million, finishing fourth at the box office. Deadline Hollywood said the opening, compared to the $48 million budget, "isn't spectacular, but there's hope that [the] film could leg out...over Thanksgiving." In its second weekend, the film dropped 14% to $12.5 million (including $17.4 million over the five-day Thanksgiving frame), finishing sixth.

Critical response
The website's critical consensus reads, "Instant Family may not quite capture the complexity of real-life adoption, but fittingly for the unconditional bond it honors, this flawed yet well-intentioned dramedy is ultimately worth the investment." On Metacritic, the film has a weighted average score of 57 out of 100, based on 28 critics, indicating "mixed or average reviews". Audiences polled by CinemaScore gave the film an average grade of "A" on an A+ to F scale, while PostTrak reported filmgoers gave it an 83% overall positive score and a 61% "definite recommend."

References

External links

 
 Instant Family on Rotten Tomatoes

2018 films
2018 comedy-drama films
American comedy-drama films
Comedy-drama films based on actual events
2010s English-language films
Films about adoption
Films directed by Sean Anders
Films produced by John Morris
Films produced by Mark Wahlberg
Films scored by Michael Andrews
Films set in California
Films shot in Atlanta
Paramount Pictures films
Films with screenplays by John Morris
Films with screenplays by Sean Anders
Hispanic and Latino American comedy films
Thanksgiving in films
Films about parenting
2010s American films
English-language comedy-drama films